Pseudlepista is a genus of moths in the subfamily Arctiinae.

Species
 Pseudlepista atriceps Aurivillius, 1921
 Pseudlepista atrizona Hampson, 1910
 Pseudlepista flavicosta Hampson, 1910
 Pseudlepista holoxantha Hampson, 1918

References

Natural History Museum Lepidoptera generic names catalog

Lithosiini